Parietaria officinalis, the eastern pellitory-of-the-wall, also known as upright pellitory and lichwort, is a plant of the nettle family. Its leaves, however, are non-stinging. The plant grows on rubbish and on walls, hence the name. 

The pollen is a cause of allergy.

Uses 
It was once used in the making of certain metheglins.

Chemistry

The leaves and flowers of P. officinalis contains the flavonoids kaempferol-3-bioside, the 3-glucosides and 3-rutinosides of quercetin, kaempferol and isorhamnetin, 3-sophorosides of quercetin and kaempferol and 3-neohesperosides of kaempferol and isorhamnetin. They also contain caffeoylmalic and two pyrrole acids.

See also 
It is in a different family from Anacyclus pyrethrum, also called pellitory.

References

External links 

officinalis
Medicinal plants
Plants described in 1753
Taxa named by Carl Linnaeus